Puncturella cucullata, common name the hooded keyhole limpet, is a species of sea snail, a marine gastropod mollusk in the family Fissurellidae, the keyhole limpets and slit limpets.

Description
The size of the shell varies between 13 mm and 28 mm.

Distribution
This marine species occurs from Alaska to Baja California, Mexico

References

 Turgeon, D.D., et al. 1998. Common and scientific names of aquatic invertebrates of the United States and Canada. American Fisheries Society Special Publication 26</ref><ref>McLean J.H. & Geiger D.L. (1998). New genera and species having the Fissurisepta shell form, with a generic-level phylogenetic analysis (Gastropoda: Fissurellidae). Contributions in Science, Natural History Museum of Los Angeles County 475:  1-32

External links
 To Encyclopedia of Life
 To GenBank (5 nucleotides; 2 proteins)
 To ITIS
 To World Register of Marine Species
 

Fissurellidae
Gastropods described in 1846